Marguerite Milward (1873 – 1953) was a British sculptor and anthropologist. She was best known for her series of busts based on racial types of Indian tribes, and her book Artist in Unknown India, which recounts her expeditions to find Indian models on which the busts were based.

Early life 
Milward was born Rosa Marguarite Edge in 1873 in King's Norton, Worcestershire. She was the daughter of a local architect, Charles Allerton Edge, the son of Charles Edge. She studied woodcarving, painting and modelling at Birmingham School of Art and Bromsgrove School. She married Philip Milward in 1901, a businessman, whose work took them both to South America. In 1907 Marguerite Milward moved to Paris to study at the Academie Colorossi and the Académie de la Grande Chaumière, becoming one of the French sculptor Antoine Bourdelle's first students.

Expeditions to India 
Milward's first visit to India was in 1926, during which time she stayed with the Bengali poet and social reformer Rabindranath Tagore at Shantineketan. In 1929, she returned to Shantineketan to teach sculpture, during which time she met Bengali physical anthropologist Biraja Sankar Guha, the first director of the Anthropological Survey of India. Milward cites these experiences as inspiration for her ethnographic expeditions. Her first expedition lasted for eight months, from 1935 to 1936, sailing for Mumbai in November 1935  In 1936, she returned to Britain for an exhibition of the busts she made at the India House, London. Her second expedition took place between 1937-1938.

She arranged her itinerary with the advice of British archaeologist and art historian Kenneth de Burgh Codrington. On his recommendation, she began her expedition in the Deccan region. Her book Artist in Unknown India details her travels across the country, including her meeting with the Nizam of Hyderabad, Mir Osman Ali Khan, the anthropologist Verrier Elwin and Prime Minister of Nepal, Juddha Shumsher Jang Bahadur Rana.

Artworks

Indian Racial Types 
Over the course of her two Indian expeditions, Milward collected enough material for over 100 racial "types", i.e. portraits of men and women from "tribal" and Adivasi groups that she believed best represented the physical characteristics of these groups. In many cases, great care was taken to select the subject, Milward prioritising people who "looked very interesting".

This series received favourable reviews, notably from anthropologist J.H. Hutton and Sir Theodore Tasker of the Indian Civil Service. Her work has been compared to Malvina Hoffman's The Races of Mankind series of sculptures.

The greater part of this series was donated to the Cambridge Museum of Archaeology and Anthropology.

Publications 
Milward, M. (1948). Artist in Unknown India. T. Werner Laurie Limited.

References

1873 births
1953 deaths
British women anthropologists
British women sculptors
British anthropologists
British sculptors